Kilukkam Kilukilukkam is a 2006 Indian Malayalam-language romantic comedy film directed by Sandhya Mohan and written by Udayakrishna-Siby K. Thomas. It is a sequel to the 1991 film Kilukkam. The film stars a new cast of Kunchacko Boban, Jayasurya and Kavya Madhavan, while Innocent and Jagathy Sreekumar reprise their roles from the original and Mohanlal appears in a cameo role. Mammukoya reprises his role as Gafoorkka from Nadodikkattu.

Synopsis

Chandini sees her father Krishnadas, Mayor of Kochi being killed by the rivals, but manages to escape from them and comes to Ooty. The needle of suspicion falls on Roychan and friend Appachan. So they move to Ooty to escape. Meanwhile, Balu and Ponnappan sees a missing child information and goes to Ooty expecting her parents to give them much money. Nischal captivated by the beauty of Chandini is also in Ooty trying to impress her. Meanwhile, Chandini goes missing. Rest of the story is how Joji gets involved and the way he leads the team to trace and save Chandini.

Cast

It also features cameo-esque footage of some actors involved in Priyadarshan's film Chup Chup Ke, during the pre-opening scene of the filmShahid Kapoor, Kareena Kapoor, Sunil Shetty, and Shakti Kapoor.

Production
The film is a sequel to the 1991 film Kilukkam directed by Priyadarshan. It was earlier titled Angamaliyile Pradhanamanthri based on a dialogue from Kilukkam.

Soundtrack 
The film's soundtrack contains 4 songs. Lyrics by Bichu Thirumala, Gireesh Puthenchery.

References

External links
 

2000s Malayalam-language films
2006 romantic comedy films
2006 films
Cross-dressing in Indian films
Indian sequel films
Films shot in Ooty
Kilukkam2
Indian romantic comedy films